The , usually abbreviated as Viderin (official) or Biderin (both: ビデ倫), was a Japanese video rating organization. It was a voluntary organization to ensure adherence to Japanese obscenity laws, which prohibit any display of genitals. This is accomplished by a mosaic pixelation that is applied to videos for sale in Japan, and the NEVA seal is placed on all videos produced by member studios, which included the larger and older adult video studios in Japan—including h.m.p., Kuki Inc., and Alice Japan, which belonged to NEVA.

History
The organization began using its latest name in January 1977.

NEVA was dissolved in November 2010, and a new organization, Ethics Organization of Video took its place. The new organization is currently known as the Japan contents Review Center.

Controversy
In June 2007, some restrictions (such as showing pubic hair) were lifted by NEVA.

In response, on August 23, 2007, the Tokyo Metropolitan police raided the offices of NEVA and several AV studios (including h.m.p.) and confiscated videos as part of an investigation of video producers and distributors suspected of distributing obscene material depicting genitals. At the beginning of March 2008, five members of NEVA, including , the former C.E.O. of h.m.p., one of the board members of NEVA and the head of the inspection division, were arrested for the sale and distribution of indecent material because the digital mosaic used was too revealing. In April 2008, NEVA announced it would be forming a new organization to provide reforms and uniform screening practices for videos.

See also
 Censorship in Japan
 Computer Entertainment Rating Organization—a Japanese rating group for video games
 Content Soft Association (formerly the Media Ethics Association ("Medirin"))—a competing video (and video game) rating organization
 Eirin—the Japanese film rating organization
 Japan Video Production Software - Sales Ethics Group (JVPS)—a competing video rating organization
 Motion picture rating system
 Pornography in Japan
 Video game content rating system#Japan

References

Further reading
 

Organizations established in 1972
Organizations disestablished in 2010
Organizations based in Tokyo
Entertainment rating organizations
Censorship in Japan
Media content ratings systems
Chūō, Tokyo